Juicio Final (2000) (Spanish for "Final Judgment") was a professional wrestling Pay-Per-View (PPV) show event produced by Consejo Mundial de Lucha Libre (CMLL) that took place on March 17, 2000 in Arena México, Mexico City, Mexico. The show was produced with the tag line, Homenaje a Dos Leyendas: El Santo y Salvador Lutteroth (Spanish for "Homage to Two Legends: El Santo and Salvador Lutteroth") to honor and remember CMLL founder Salvador Lutteroth and El Santo, the most famous Mexican wrestler ever.  This was the tenth time that CMLL used the name "Jucio Final" for one of their major shows.

The show featured six matches in total with the main event of the show being a Lucha de Apuestas, mask vs. mask match between Villano III and Atlantis in a match that has been called "The biggest Apuesta match of the decade". The match was voted the 2000 Match of the Year in the Wrestling Observer Newsletter awards. The show featured four additional matches, including two Six-man "Lucha Libre rules" tag team matches, a singles match and a 16-man Torneo cibernetico elimination match.

Production

Background
Since 1996 the Mexican wrestling company Consejo Mundial de Lucha Libre (Spanish for "World Wrestling Council"; CMLL) has held a show in March each year to commemorate the passing of CMLL founder Salvador Lutteroth who died in March 1987. For the first three years the show paid homage to Lutteroth himself, from 1999 through 2004 the show paid homage to Lutteroth and El Santo, Mexico's most famous wrestler ever and from 2005 forward the show has paid homage to Lutteroth and a different leyenda ("Legend") each year, celebrating the career and accomplishments of past CMLL stars. Originally billed as Homenaje a Salvador Lutteroth, it has been held under the Homenaje a Dos Leyendas ("Homage to two legends") since 1999 and is the only show outside of CMLL's Anniversary shows that CMLL has presented every year since its inception. All Homenaje a Dos Leyendas shows have been held in Arena México in Mexico City, Mexico which is CMLL's main venue, its "home". Traditionally CMLL holds their major events on Friday Nights, which means the Homenaje a Dos Leyendas shows replace their regularly scheduled Super Viernes show. The 2000 show was the fifth overall Homenaje a Dos Leyendas show. The show was also billed as Jucio Final ("Final Judgement"), an event name or tag line that CMLL has used intermittently since the mid-1950s. It is no longer an annually recurring show, but instead held intermittently sometimes several years apart and not always in the same month of the year either. All Juicio Final shows have been held in Arena México in Mexico City, Mexico which is CMLL's main venue, its "home".

Storylines

The JuicioFinal show featured six professional wrestling matches with different wrestlers involved in pre-existing scripted feuds, plots and storylines. Wrestlers were portrayed as either heels (referred to as rudos in Mexico, those that portray the "bad guys") or faces (técnicos in Mexico, the "good guy" characters) as they followed a series of tension-building events, which culminated in a wrestling match or series of matches.

Results

Torneo Generación XXI order of elimination

References

2000 in professional wrestling
2000
CMLL Juicio Final
2000s in Mexico City
2000 in Mexico
March 2000 events in Mexico